Built to Destroy may refer to:

Built to Destroy (Michael Schenker Group album), 1983 album by Michael Schenker Group
Built to Destroy (Incite album), 2019 album by Incite